Dr. Alvin J. Schexnider is an American educator who became the acting president of Norfolk State University in July 2005 and served as acting president until Dr. Carolyn Winstead Meyers became president on July 1, 2006.

References

Presidents of Norfolk State University
Grambling State University alumni
Northwestern University alumni
Living people
Place of birth missing (living people)
Year of birth missing (living people)